Sarah Speight  is an academic and Professor of Higher Education at the University of Nottingham. Since 2020, she has been Pro Vice Chancellor for Education and Student Experience and was previously head of the School of Education.

Speight studied at the University of Manchester and went on to complete a PhD at the University of Nottingham. Her research spans the fields of higher education, archaeology and history.

Education
Speight studied at the University of Manchester where she completed a Bachelor of Arts in history. She went on to study at the University of Nottingham, completing a Master of Arts in 1989 and a PhD at the same institution in 1993, titled Family, faith and fortification: Yorkshire 1066–1250, the latter under the supervision of Philip Dixon.

Career
Speight works at the University of Nottingham and has taught for the Schools of Continuing Education, Education, and History. She  was also head of the university's School of Education for five years. In 2006, she received the university's Lord Dearing Award, which recognises "outstanding achievements ... in enhancing the student learning experience". In 2013, Speight was awarded a National Teaching Fellowship.

Speight was Honorary Treasurer of the Castle Studies Group between 1998 and 2001. Between 2001 and 2006, Speight was the Archaeology Editor for the Transactions of the Thoroton Society of Nottinghamshire. Her specialism in castles led to her appearing in episodes of Time Team about Beaudesert Castle (2002) and Codnor Castle (2008). Speight was part of a movement examining the impact of castles on settlements and the landscape; Speight contributed a study of castle chapels to this area.

Selected publications

Speight has published articles in venues such as Journal of Educational Administration and History, Château Gaillard: Études de castellologie médiévale, History Compass, and the Transactions of the Thoroton Society of Nottinghamshire.

Castle studies and archaeology

Education

References

External links

Profile on the University of Nottingham website

British women archaeologists
Year of birth missing (living people)
Living people
21st-century British women writers
Alumni of the University of Manchester
Alumni of the University of Nottingham
Academics of the University of Nottingham
Castellologists
British archaeologists
21st-century British writers